The Latin phrase sub rosa (New Latin for "under the rose"), denotes secrecy or confidentiality and is used in English to denote secrecy or confidentiality, similar to the Chatham House Rule. The rose has a long, ancient history as a symbol of secrecy.

History 

The rose has held a deeply symbolic significance in many times and cultures as a symbol of maternal creativity and of the yoni or feminine generative power. The literal rose and its essence or attar has also played a role in religious and spiritual rites which ofttimes would have been held in secret.

The rose has sometimes been said to have been the emblem of the god Horus in ancient Egypt. However, the gods in Egypt were usually associated with the lotus. The idea of Horus being linked to the rose probably arises from Greek and Roman cultural cross-transmission of myths from Egypt. Firstly, the rose's connotation of secrecy dates back also to Greek mythology. Aphrodite gave a rose to her son Eros, the god of love; he, in turn, gave it to Harpocrates, the god of silence and a Greek name for a form of Horus, to ensure that his mother's indiscretions (or those of the gods in general, in other accounts) were not disclosed. Secondly, in Egypt, the rose was actually sacred to Isis, but this appears to have been during the Roman period of Egyptian history—"Probably due to assimilation with the goddess Aphrodite (Venus), during the Roman period, the rose was used in her worship." 

Later, the Greeks and Romans translated the god's Egyptian name Heru-pa-khered as Harpocrates and regarded him as the god of silence. The association of Harpocrates with silence and secrecy originates from a misunderstanding of Egyptian depictions of the god. Heru-pa-khered was represented as a naked youth with a finger-to-mouth gesture—in Egyptian artwork this gesture imitates the hieroglyph for child and is used to represent youth, but was misunderstood by Greeks and Romans as a gesture for silence.

Paintings of roses on the ceilings of Roman banquet rooms were also a reminder that things said under the influence of wine (sub vino) should also remain sub rosa. 

In the Middle Ages a rose suspended from the ceiling of a council chamber similarly pledged all present (those under the rose) to secrecy.

In Christian symbolism, inherited from older roots, the phrase "sub rosa" has a special place in confessions, where roses were carved on confessionals to signify that the conversations would remain secret. Pictures of five-petalled roses were often carved on confessionals, indicating that the conversations would remain secret. The phrase has also been understood to refer to the mysterious virginal conception of Christ.  

The rose is also an esoteric symbol of Rosicrucianism which was often considered to be a secret society or brotherhood.

  
In the 16th century, the symbol of Henry VII of England was the stylised Tudor dynasty rose.  A large image of the rose covered the ceiling of the private chamber where decisions of state were made in secret.

The phrase entered the German language (unter der Rose) and, later, the English language, both as a Latin loan phrase (at least as early as 1654) and in its English translation.  

In current times, the term is used by the Scottish Government for a specific series of "off the record" meetings.

See also
 Language of flowers
 Chatham House Rule

References

Latin words and phrases
Secrecy